Paramegalonychus is a genus of ground beetles in the family Carabidae. There are about 11 described species in Paramegalonychus, found in Africa.

Species
These 11 species belong to the genus Paramegalonychus:
 Paramegalonychus bitalensis Basilewsky, 1975  (Democratic Republic of the Congo)
 Paramegalonychus brunneipennis (Burgeon, 1935)  (Kenya and Uganda)
 Paramegalonychus brunneoniger (Kolbe, 1889)  (Cameroon, Democratic Republic of the Congo, Guinea, Ivory Coast, and Sierra Leone)
 Paramegalonychus lamottei (Basilewsky, 1951)  (Cameroon, Guinea, Ivory Coast, and Sierra Leone)
 Paramegalonychus mgetae Basilewsky, 1962  (Tanzania)
 Paramegalonychus montanus (Basilewsky, 1956)  (Burundi and Rwanda)
 Paramegalonychus mulanjensis Basilewsky, 1988  (Malawi)
 Paramegalonychus nyakageranus Basilewsky, 1975  (Democratic Republic of the Congo)
 Paramegalonychus orophilus Basilewsky, 1962  (Tanzania)
 Paramegalonychus paludicola Basilewsky, 1975  (Democratic Republic of the Congo)
 Paramegalonychus tshibindensis (Burgeon, 1933)  (Burundi, Democratic Republic of the Congo, and Rwanda)

References

Platyninae